The Beaver River is a tributary of the Stewart River in Yukon Territory, Canada.

See also
List of rivers of Yukon

References
Canadian GeoNames Database entry "Beaver River, Yukon"

External links
Location map from Canadian GeoNames Database

Rivers of Yukon